"In High Places" is a song by musician Mike Oldfield, included in the 1983 album Crises and released as a single in 1987 (see 1987 in music), along with (on the B-side) "Poison Arrows" (from Discovery) and "Jungle Gardenia" (non-album track).

Delayed single release 
On the occasion of Virgin Records founder Richard Branson's launch of the then-largest hot-air balloon ever made, the song was released as a single in 1987 in the UK and Spain, four years after the Crises LP.  It features Jon Anderson (lead singer of the progressive rock band Yes) on vocals and as co-writer.

Use in sampling 
"In High Places" is sampled in Kanye West's song "Dark Fantasy" from the 2010 album, My Beautiful Dark Twisted Fantasy, and in DJ Wich's song "Much Higher", from the 2008 album,  The Golden Touch.

Track listing 
 "In High Places" (Oldfield, Anderson) – 3:33
 "Poison Arrows" (Oldfield) – 3:53
 "Jungle Gardenia" (Oldfield) – 2:37

References 

 

1987 singles
Mike Oldfield songs
Songs written by Jon Anderson
Songs written by Mike Oldfield
Virgin Records singles